Eulimnichus is a genus of minute marsh-loving beetles in the family Limnichidae. There are more than 30 described species in Eulimnichus.

Species
These 32 species belong to the genus Eulimnichus:

 Eulimnichus acutus Wooldridge, 1979
 Eulimnichus analis (LeConte, 1879)
 Eulimnichus ater (Leconte, 1854)
 Eulimnichus californicus (Leconte, 1879)
 Eulimnichus coheni Wooldridge, 1979
 Eulimnichus coloradensis Casey
 Eulimnichus corrinae Wooldridge
 Eulimnichus corrineae Wooldridge, 1979
 Eulimnichus epistemus Sharp, 1902
 Eulimnichus evanescens Casey, 1912
 Eulimnichus expeditus Wooldridge, 1984
 Eulimnichus impostus Wooldridge, 1978
 Eulimnichus improcerus Wooldridge, 1979
 Eulimnichus incultus Wooldridge, 1979
 Eulimnichus langleyae Wooldridge, 1979
 Eulimnichus montanus (LeConte, 1879)
 Eulimnichus nitidulus (LeConte, 1854)
 Eulimnichus obscurus (LeConte, 1854)
 Eulimnichus optatus Sharp, 1902
 Eulimnichus pellucidus Wooldridge, 1979
 Eulimnichus perpolitus (Casey, 1889)
 Eulimnichus plebius Sharp, 1902
 Eulimnichus rugiceps Casey
 Eulimnichus rugulosus Wooldridge, 1979
 Eulimnichus rusticus Wooldridge, 1979
 Eulimnichus sculpticeps Casey
 Eulimnichus sharpi Wooldridge, 1979
 Eulimnichus sordidus Sharp, 1902
 Eulimnichus spangleri Wooldridge, 1979
 Eulimnichus subitus Wooldridge, 1979
 Eulimnichus sublaevis Sharp, 1902
 Eulimnichus visendus Wooldridge, 1979

References

Further reading

 
 

Byrrhoidea
Articles created by Qbugbot